Makhdoom or Makhdum is a clan found mainly in South Punjab, Pakistan.

Punjabi tribes